Pinoy Records is a Philippine television infotainment show broadcast by GMA Network. Hosted by Chris Tiu and Sheena Halili, it premiered on December 8, 2007. The show concluded on July 17, 2010, with a total of 135 episodes.

Hosts

Chris Tiu
Sheena Halili
Jai Reyes - segment host of Face Your Fear
Bearwin Meily - segment host of Totoong Magic

Former host
Manny Pacquiao

Guest hosts
Rhian Ramos
Iza Calzado
Kris Bernal

Segments
Pinoy Extreme Talent with Chris and Sheena
Biyaheng Sikat with Sheena and random celebrity
Face Your Fear with Jai
Gawang Pinoy
Bidang Pinoy
Totoong Magic with Bearwin
Celebrity Face Off

Ratings
According to AGB Nielsen Philippines' Mega Manila People/Individual television ratings, the final episode of Pinoy Records scored a 7.8% rating.

Accolades

References

2007 Philippine television series debuts
2010 Philippine television series endings
Filipino-language television shows
GMA Network original programming
Philippine reality television series